K.N.P Kurup (born K.N. Purushothama Kurup ) was an Indian politician, Communist leader and journalist. He is known for his work with the Government of Kerala in Kollam and Alapuzha. He is the founder of the evening daily Kerala Rajyam. He was the President of Edathuva Panchayat in Alapuzha. His biography, Poratta Vazhikalile Akshara Sooryan, was launched by Shri. Pinarayi Vijayan in 2010.

References

Living people
Journalists from Kerala
Communist Party of India (Marxist) politicians from Kerala
Politicians from Alappuzha
1938 births